The Honourable Galmo "Gilley" Williams is a Turks and Caicos Islander politician who served as the 2nd Premier of the Turks and Caicos Islands from 23 March 2009 to 14 August 2009.

Early life
He was schooled at the Bottle Creek Primary School (now Adelaide Oemler Primary) and then at the Bottle Creek High School (now Raymond Gardiner High). He later attended the Miami Lakes Technical Institute from where he graduated with a diploma in Hospitality and Culinary Management.

Political career
Williams served as the Cabinet minister responsible for Home Affairs and Public Safety within the Michael Misick administration.  As such Williams oversaw the majority of the functions concerning: Immigration, Labour, Fire Services, Prisons, Natural Disaster, Road Safety, Registration of Births & Deaths, Emergency Services, Search and Rescue, Cadet Programme, and Coastal Petrol.

On 19 February 2009, Williams resigned from the Misick administration and launched his campaign to topple him as leader of the Progressive National Party (PNP).  On 28 February 2009, Williams won a three-way battle for the position of leader of the PNP.

Following intense pressure from the Progressive National Party members, Misick resigned on 23 March 2009. Later in the afternoon Williams took the oath of office of the Premier, and became the second Premier of the Turks and Caicos Islands. However, the office of premier was suspended on August 14 and transferred to the governor, against the PNP's wishes.

Notes

External links
Progressive National Party - Profile: Hon. Galmo W. Williams

20th-century births
Living people
Premiers of the Turks and Caicos Islands
Progressive National Party (Turks and Caicos Islands) politicians
Turks and Caicos Islands Christians